Salsabil (romanized as , , , ,) may refer to:

Salsabil (Quran)
Salsabil (fountain) with a large surface area
Salsabil (horse)

Arabic words and phrases